Almonia atratalis is a moth in the family Crambidae. It is found in Papua New Guinea.

References

Acentropinae
Moths of New Guinea
Moths described in 1915